Konongo and Ruwila (or Rwira) constitute a Bantu language of central Tanzania that is closely related to Nyamwezi – close enough to sometimes be counted as a dialect of Nyamwezi. Ruwila was until recently quite poorly attested.

References

Northeast Bantu languages
Languages of Tanzania